Uriah Goodwin  (1859 – 1924) was a Welsh male international footballer. He was part of the Wales national football team, playing 1 match on 26  February 1881 against England. On club level he played for Ruthin Town F.C. He competed at the 1879–80 Welsh Cup, scoring a goal in the final against Druids F.C.

See also
 List of Wales international footballers (alphabetical)

References

1859 births
1924 deaths
Welsh footballers
Wales international footballers
Place of birth missing
Date of death missing
Association football wingers
Ruthin Town F.C. players